Michele Skatar (born December 30, 1985) is a Croatian naturalized Italian handball player, currently free agent, runner-up in the EHF Cup (2013). Skatar played for professional teams in Croatia, Italy, Germany and France. At international level, he represented the Italian national team on 141 occasions, scoring 589 goals. He earned his first cap against Turkey on December 27, 2004, and took part in the Mediterranean Games four times consecutively (2005, 2009, 2013 and 2018) with Italy. Skatar won the Capocannoniere (Serie A top goalscorer) award during the 2005–06 season and became the first Italian ever to play in the German Handball-Bundesliga and to reach a European Cup final. He is the younger brother of poet and sports agent Daniel Skatar.

Honours

Club

2. Handball-Bundesliga 
 2008-09

Italian Under-21 Championship 
 2005-06

Italian Handball Trophy 
 2004-05

EHF Cup 
 Runner-up: 2012-13

Croatian Handball Cup
 Runner-up: 2002-03

Coupe de la Ligue 
 Runner-up: 2012-13

Coppa Italia 
 Runner-up: 2004–05, 2013–14

Serie A 
 Runner-up: 2004-05

Italian Handball Trophy 
 Runner-up: 2005-06

Individual
  Serie A Top Scorer (233 goals): 2005-06
  Italian Handball Trophy Top Scorer: 2005-06
  Italian Under-21 Championship MVP: 2005-06
  French D2 Proligue All-Star: 2009-10
  French Nationale 1 Top Scorer (183 goals): 2017-18

References

External links 
 Michele Skatar verstärkt den SSV Loacker Bozen Volksbank – SSV Bozen
 Proligue | Pontault, Angers et Besançon peaufinent leur effectif
 Handzone - LSL Les Nommés pour les Trophées LNH 2019 mercredi 22 mai 2019 : Stats et infos
 Qualificazioni EHF EURO 2020: l'Italia fa festa! Lussemburgo battuto, gli azzurri volano alla 2^ fase
 Handzone - Nationale 1M Montélimar-Cruas fait souffrir l'Espérance de Tunis mardi 30 août 2016 : Stats et infos
 Handzone - Nationale 1M Skatar et Donoso, deux recrues première-classe pour Montélimar jeudi 7 juillet 2016 : Stats et infos
 Mercato | L’azzurro Michele Skatar al Montélimar | PallamanoItalia
 Qualificazioni Mondiali 2017: pronostico rispettato, l'Austria passa contro l'Italia a Trieste
 LNH - Transferts | Michele Skatar rejoint la Bretagne
 TERRAQUILIA HANDBALL CARPI INGAGGIA MICHELE SKATAR
 [M] Mersin 2013: IMPRESA ITALIA, È SEMIFINALE! 
 Pallamano: Michele Skatar secondo con il suo Nantes in EHF Cup
 Michele Skatar, un italiano in finale di EHF Cup | PallamanoItalia
 A. Hamad, dans le 7 majeur de la D2 !
 Under 21, Pallamano Trieste campione d'Italia - Il Piccolo
 Skatar è il capocannoniere - Il Piccolo
 Il cannoniere Skatar va a giocare in Germania - Il Piccolo

Italian male handball players
Croatian male handball players
1985 births
Living people
Croatian emigrants to Italy
Naturalised citizens of Italy
Sportspeople from Koper
Competitors at the 2005 Mediterranean Games
Competitors at the 2009 Mediterranean Games
Competitors at the 2013 Mediterranean Games
Competitors at the 2018 Mediterranean Games
Mediterranean Games competitors for Italy